The Fifth of November is a 2018 psychological thriller short film directed by Javier Augusto Nunez and written by Nunez and Qurrat Ann Kadwani. The film stars Kadwani, William H. Bryant Jr., Joanna DeLane and Shaw Jones.

Cast 
Qurrat Ann Kadwani as Jane Evans
William H. Bryant Jr. as Zachary Williams
Joanna DeLane as Alejandra Guerrero
Shaw Jones as Owen Smith

Production 

The Fifth of November was created in San Diego. Actress Qurrat Ann Kadwani starred in and produced the film.

Release 

The film screened at the San Diego International Film Festival, NYC International Reel Film Festival and NewFilmmakers NY. The film was distributed by ShortsTV.

Reception 
Horrornews.net claims that "the filmmakers did a commendable job giving us a horror film based on real-world events and treated the subject matter with respect. Jeremie Sabourin of Cinema Smack scored it 4 out of 5 stars an said that while it "isn’t quite an enjoyable view given its subject matter, it’s a thought-provoking piece of cinema that’s certainly worthy of discussion." Olivia York at Agnès Films called it "stunning [...] and does not sugarcoat the effects" of mass shootings. Rebecca Cherry at Film Carnage rated it 4 out of 5 stars claiming "it’s a poignant satire that has an important message." In a review at Asian Movie Pulse, Adam Symchuk says that "although the short film may have some valid points, the way the subject matter is presented negates social message." Movie Deputy rated it 1 out of 10 calling it "a vile and disgusting presentation." Richard Propes of The Independent Critic says it is "an engaging, memorable film with a strong central performance by Kadwani." She won two awards for Best Actress.

References

External links 

 
 
 

2018 short films
American short films
Films shot in San Diego
Films set in San Diego
Films about mass murder
Gun violence in fiction
2018 crime thriller films
2018 psychological thriller films
Films about grieving
2018 horror thriller films
Films about social issues in the United States
2010s English-language films